Tonlé Bassac is a commune (sangkat) of Chamkar Mon District in Phnom Penh, Cambodia. Lying beside the Bassac River, the area has become a hub of development projects in the last two years, drawing comparisons with Marina Bay, Singapore.

Geography 	
The area extends from the banks of the Bassac River in the east, to National Highway One in the south, across to Monivong Boulevard in the west, and Samdach Preah Sihanouk Boulevard in the north. The area is home to the  Phsar Kapko market and various cultural boutiques and modern restaurants.

Planned developments 
Aeon Mall 1
Habitat Condominium
Toyoko Inn Hotel 
mixed-use developments such as The Bridge, The Peak and DI Riviera.
Naga 2, a massive hotel and gaming extension to the NagaWorld Hotel 	
the $2 billion, 560m (1,837 ft) Thai Boon Roong Twin Trade Center

Education
iCan British International School is in Tonle Bassac commune.

References

Phnom Penh
Tonle Bassac, Sangkat